CLG Chill Chartha is a GAA club based in Kilcar, County Donegal, in Ulster, Ireland. They have won the Donegal Senior Football Championship on six occasions, the last in 2017.
They regard themselves as being "down the trough".

The club has an intense rivalry with Na Cealla Beaga. The club also maintains a strong rivalry with their neighbours, Naomh Columba.

History
John McNulty, a former candidate for the Seanad, managed the club to Junior "B", Minor and Under-21 Championships and the 2014 Division 1 league title, though he did not win the Senior Football Championship.

League
CLG Chill Chartha play in Division 1 of the Donegal All County league and are a record 14 times league champions (1933, 1935, 1959, 1975, 1979, 1981, 1982, 1983, 1984, 1987, 2014, 2016, 2017 and 2019). The club was relegated in 2009; despite finishing a point off a league semi place, the club went down after a number of play-offs. The club made its return to the top flight after winning the Division 2 title in 2011.

In 2014, the club won the senior Division One League title for the first time since 1987, following a 5–17 to 0–10 win away to Gaoth Dobhair.

Championship
The club won the Senior Championship for the first time in 1925 and the most recent was in 2017, following a 0–07 to 0–04 win over Naomh Conaill, the club's first win since 1993 (and sixth overall). In 2016, the club made its first final appearance since 1993 but lost to Glenswilly by a point. The club faced Naomh Conaill in the 2020 final, which was put on hold due to the impact of the COVID-19 pandemic on Gaelic games.

The club won the Comórtas Peile na Gaeltachta on six occasions, the most recent being in 2014, and won the county Gaeltacht on nine occasions, the last being in 2019 (2020 was not played). The club also won the Junior Gaeltacht on two occasions, most famously in 1989, when it won both national titles at Naomh Columba.

At underage level, the club has won the County Under 21 Championship on six occasions (1972, 1973, 1974, 2011, 2013 and 2015). The club won the Minor title on four occasions (1964, 1998, 2010 and 2012), along with a lot of underage honours.

Notable players

 Michael Carr — 1983 Ulster Senior Football Championship final man of the match; 1980 Donegal Senior Football Championship final man of the match
 Michael Hegarty — 2011 Ulster SFC winner
 Patrick McBrearty — 2012 All-Ireland SFC winner and Stephen's brother
 Stephen McBrearty — Patrick's brother
 Andrew McClean
 Ciaran McGinley — Kilcar captain
 Eoin McHugh — James's son
 James McHugh — 1992 All-Ireland SFC winner and Martin's brother
 Mark McHugh — Martin's son and 2012 All-Ireland SFC winner
 Martin McHugh — 1992 All-Ireland SFC winner and James's brother
 Ryan McHugh — Martin's son and Mark's younger brother

Managers

Chairmen
The following men have been chairman of the club.

Honours
 Donegal Senior Football Championship: 1925, 1980, 1985, 1989, 1993, 2017
 All-County Football League Division 1 title: 2016, 2017
 Donegal Senior League Championship: 1933, 1935, 1959, 1975, 1979, 1981, 1982, 1983, 1984, 1987, 2014, 2016, 2017, 2019
 Donegal Senior Football League Shield Championship: 1982, 1983, 1985
 Donegal Senior Reserve Football Championship: 1991, 1994, 2011, 2016
 Donegal Senior Reserve Football League Championship: 1991, 1992, 1993, 2004, 2017
 Donegal Junior Football Championship: 1971, 1993
 Comórtas Peile na Gaeltachta Senior All Ireland Championship: 1987, 1989, 1990, 1991, 2008, 2014
 Comórtas Peile na Gaeltachta Senior Donegal Football Championship: 1970, 1975, 1982, 1987, 1989, 1999, 2000, 2014
 Comórtas Peile na Gaeltachta Junior All Ireland Championship: 1975, 1989
 Comórtas Peile na Gaeltachta Junior Donegal Championship: 1990, 2008
 Donegal Under-21 Football Championship: 1972, 1973, 1974, 2011, 2013, 2015
 Donegal Minor Football Championship: 1964, 1998, 2010, 2012

References

External links
 Official website of C.L.G. Chill Chartha

1924 establishments in Ireland
Gaelic football clubs in County Donegal
Gaelic games clubs in County Donegal